Khasan may refer to:

Places
Lake Khasan, on the border of Russia and North Korea, location of the Battle of Lake Khasan
Khasan (urban-type settlement), an urban-type settlement in Primorsky Krai, Russia

People with the name

Khasan Akhriyev (born 1994), Russian footballer
Khasan Bakayev, Chechen historian
Khasan Baroyev (born 1982), Russian wrestler
Khasan Isaev (born 1952), Bulgarian wrestler
Khasan Yandiyev (1948-2008), Russian judge
Khasan Dzhunidov (born 1991), Russian association football player
Khasan Khalmurzaev (born 1993), Russian judoka
Khasan Khatsukov (born 1995), Russian footballer
Khasan Mamtov (born 1984), Russian association football player

Other
Khasan class monitor
Soviet monitor Khasan

See also
Khasan, land of khas people